Dichlorofluorescein (DCF) is an organic dye of the fluorescein family, being substituted at the 2 and 7 positions by chloride.

It is used as an indicator for argentometry by Fajans method.

When used as an indicator, upon reaching the equivalence point of a titration reaction the color shifts from colorless towards a faint pink. 

It is also used in the cellular antioxidant activity (CAA) assay. Dichlorofluorescin (DCFH) is a probe that is trapped within cells and is easily oxidized to fluorescent dichlorofluorescein (DCF). The method measures the ability of compounds to prevent the formation of DCF by 2,2'-Azobis(2-amidinopropane) dihydrochloride (ABAP)-generated peroxyl radicals in human hepatocarcinoma HepG2 cells. By itself, dichlorofluorescin (DCFH) also quantifies intracellular hydrogen peroxide as well as cellular oxidative stress.

References 

Fluorone dyes
Chloroarenes
Spiro compounds
Hydroxyarenes
Triarylmethane dyes